Yomira Tibisay Pinzón Ríos (born 23 August 1996) is a Panamanian footballer who plays as a defender for Costa Rican club Deportivo Saprissa and the Panama women's national team. She is nicknamed Yomi.

International goals
Scores and results list Panama's goal tally first

See also
 List of Panama women's international footballers

References

External links
Yomira Pinzón at BDFutbol

1996 births
Living people
Sportspeople from Panama City
Panamanian women's footballers
Women's association football defenders
Women's association football midfielders
Tauro F.C. players
Deportivo Saprissa players
Segunda Federación (women) players
Panama women's international footballers
Pan American Games competitors for Panama
Footballers at the 2019 Pan American Games
Panamanian expatriate women's footballers
Panamanian expatriate sportspeople in Spain
Expatriate women's footballers in Spain
Panamanian expatriate sportspeople in Costa Rica
Expatriate women's footballers in Costa Rica